Daniel K. Nomura is an American chemical biologist and Professor of Chemical Biology and Molecular Therapeutics at the University of California, Berkeley, in the Departments of Chemistry and Molecular & Cell Biology. His work employs chemoproteomic approaches to develop small molecule therapeutics and therapeutic modalities against traditionally "undruggable" proteins.

He is a member of the scientific advisory committee of the Mark Foundation for Cancer Research, a foundation set up by billionaire Alexander Knaster which funds early-stage cancer research.  He is also an Investment Advisory Board Member for Droia Ventures.

Research and education 
Nomura received his BA in Molecular and Cell Biology in 2003 and PhD in Molecular Toxicology in 2008 from UC Berkeley, studying under the mentorship of John Casida. He went on to perform his postdoctoral research with Ben Cravatt at Scripps Research in La Jolla, California. There he discovered a role for monoacylglycerol lipase in generating oncogenic signaling lipids that promote cancer and in proinflammatory cascades that impact neurodegenerative disorders. In 2011, Nomura started his independent research group at UC Berkeley. His work focuses on implementing chemoproteomic platforms to develop small molecule therapeutics against traditionally "undruggable" proteins. These approaches have led to the discovery of novel inhibitors and new ligands that expand the scope of proteolysis targeting chimeras (PROTACS), which are bifunctional molecules that harness the cells ubiquitin-proteasome system to degrade targets of interest. Notable recent discoveries include an inhibitor of mTORC1, a molecular glue between UBR7 and p53 that activates p53 tumor suppressor activity, a covalent inhibitor against MYC, novel covalent recruiters against E3 ubiquitin ligases such as RNF114, RNF4, and FEM1B for targeted protein degradation applications, the Deubiquitinase Targeting Chimera (DUBTAC) platform for targeted protein stabilization, and a chemical rational design strategy for developing molecular glue degraders.  In 2017, Nomura became the Director of the Novartis-Berkeley Translational Chemical Biology Institute, which aims to develop chemical technologies and therapeutics against undruggable targets. Nomura is also co-founder of Frontier Medicines and Vicinitas Therapeutics.

Awards 
 2019 Mark Foundation for Cancer Research ASPIRE award  
 2022 National Cancer Institute Outstanding Investigator Award

References 

1953 births
Living people